The short-tailed field tyrant (Muscigralla brevicauda) is a species of bird in the family Tyrannidae. It is monotypic within the genus Muscigralla. It is found in Ecuador, Peru and far northern Chile where its natural habitats are subtropical or tropical dry shrubland and pastureland.

References

short-tailed field tyrant
Birds of Ecuador
Birds of Peru
short-tailed field tyrant
Taxonomy articles created by Polbot